Royal Air Force Bradwell Bay or more simply RAF Bradwell Bay is a former Royal Air Force station located  east of Maldon, Essex, England and  south west of West Mersea, Essex.

History
The central area of the current airfield was first laid down before WW2 as a grass-surfaced landing ground for the nearby Dengie firing ranges off the coast before being rebuilt from 1940 onwards as an enlarged RAF station with concrete runways, hangars and ancillary buildings. The station is unique as it was the only fighter station where the Fog Investigation and Dispersal Operation (FIDO) was used.

Based units

Units

Current use
An area of the northern part of the site is occupied by the remains of the Bradwell nuclear power station, the Magnox element of which is currently being decommissioned.
Several of the hangars are still used as storage by the local farmers and the control tower is now a private house. 
Agricultural buildings, built in the '70s and '80s on runways one and two, are now home to several local businesses.

See also
List of former Royal Air Force stations

References

Citations

Bibliography

External links

 Bradwell Bay Preservation Group
 RAF Bradwell Bay Facebook group
 Broody's War
 Bradwell Bay United (Local football club)

Defunct airports in England
Royal Air Force stations in Essex
Royal Air Force stations of World War II in the United Kingdom